St Saviour's and St Olave's Church of England School is a secondary school and sixth form for girls located on New Kent Road near Elephant and Castle, in the London Borough of Southwark, England. It is a voluntary aided Church of England school in the Anglican Diocese of Southwark and is affiliated to the Woodard Schools group.

History
The school was founded in 1903 as a girls' grammar school to complement St Olave's and St Saviour's Grammar School for boys, after the Charity Commissioners had required that girls in the area should be afforded some equality of education, and the Governors of the joint foundation agreed to use their endowment to provide this.  Both schools are beneficiaries of the charitable St Olave's and St Saviour's Schools Foundation, which in turn is a beneficiary of The Dulwich Estate, successor to the historic College of God's Gift charity. (See also St Saviour's Grammar School, and St Olave's Grammar School.)

On examination of the separate governing instruments of the two ancient grammar schools which had merged a few years before, it was clear that St Olave's purpose to educate "boys", while that of St Saviour's was to do so for "younglings".  St Olave's governors had already set up a 'Girls School Fund' but the Dulwich and St Saviour's endowment was vital to realise this proposal. It was therefore proposed to set up a new girls' school, to be called 'St Saviour's and St Olave's Grammar School for Girls'. A local landowner, Lord Llangattock, was approached to provide a site, and this new part of the educational foundation was opened in 1903 at the present New Kent Road site. Two small parish schools and old endowment, for St Thomas (the 'May Feast Society') and St John's girls schools, were combined into it.

The school ceased to be a grammar school in the Inner London Education Authority reorganisation of the 1960s. A new chapel was consecrated by the Archbishop of Canterbury in 1999. In 2001 Tony Blair, while Prime Minister, announced that year's General Election while on a visit to the New Kent Road site.  For the celebration of the centenary of the school in 2003, HM Queen Elizabeth visited it and unveiled a commemorative piece of public art.

Present day
The school remains a semi-independent Church of England voluntary aided school.  The similar names for the girls' and boys' schools and the educational foundation sometimes cause confusion, but when a proposal to rename the girls' school simply 'St Saviour's' was made it was unwelcome. Nevertheless, the "old girls'" association call themselves the 'Salvatorians', while the old boys of St Olave's are known as 'Old Olavians'.

The school holds its annual Commemoration Service at the ancient parish church, now known as Southwark Cathedral.

Notable former pupils
 Liz Fraser, actress
 Kathleen Harrison, actress
 Marianne Jean-Baptiste, actress 
 Deborah Levy, novelist, playwright and poet
Susie Wokoma, actress and writer

References

Further reading
Carrington, R. C. Two Schools: A History of the St. Olave's and St. Saviour's Grammar School Foundation (London: The Governors of the St. Olave's and St. Saviour's Grammar School Foundation, 1971).
Humphrey, Stephen, Southwark, Bermondsey and Rotherhithe in the series Britain in Old Photographs (Stroud, Gloucestershire: Alan Sutton Publishing, 1995), pp. 65, 126.

External links
St Saviour's and St Olave's Church of England School website
Profile at Direct.gov

Girls' schools in London
Woodard Schools
Secondary schools in the London Borough of Southwark
Church of England secondary schools in the Diocese of Southwark
Voluntary aided schools in London
Educational institutions established in 1903
1903 establishments in England